The 2017 Men's EuroHockey Championship IV was the seventh edition of EuroHockey Championship IV, the fourth tier of the European field hockey championships organized by the European Hockey Federation. It was held from 31 July until 5 August 2017 in Lipovci, Slovenia.

Gibraltar won the tournament by finishing top in the round robin tournament and they secured a place in the 2019 EuroHockey Championship III.

Teams
The following five teams shown with pre-tournament world rankings competed in the tournament.
 (57)
 (75)
 (73)
 (68)
 (–)

Results

Pool

Matches
All times are local, CEST (UTC+2).

See also
2017 Men's EuroHockey Championship III

References

External links
FIH page

EuroHockey Championship IV
Men 4
EuroHockey Championship IV Men
International field hockey competitions hosted by Slovenia
EuroHockey Championship IV Men
EuroHockey Championship IV Men